Omer Buchsenbaum (born 12 November 1982) is an Israeli former professional footballer who works as the head of youth development for Hapoel Tel Aviv.

Career
After being relegated with Maccabi Herzliya to the second league, Omer Buchsenbaum transferred to Maccabi Petah Tikva where he signed a contract for two years.

He is the son of Avi Buchsenbaum, a former player of Hapoel Ramat Gan.

He retired on 29 October 2014.

Honours
 Israel State Cup: 2003, 2013
 Israeli Championships: 2003–04
 Toto Cup: 2004–05, 2006–07
 Liga Leumit: 2011–12
 Toto Cup (Leumit): 2011

References

External links
  Profile of Omer Buchsenbaum on Maccabi Haifa's official website
  Profile and statistics of Omer Buchsenbaum on One.co.il

1982 births
Living people
Israeli Jews
Israeli footballers
Association football midfielders
Hakoah Maccabi Ramat Gan F.C. players
Hapoel Ramat Gan F.C. players
Maccabi Haifa F.C. players
Hapoel Petah Tikva F.C. players
Maccabi Herzliya F.C. players
Maccabi Petah Tikva F.C. players
Liga Leumit players
Israeli Premier League players
Footballers from Ramat Gan